Kasmodiah is an album written by Deine Lakaien. It was released in 1999. The album ranked #5 on the German Alternative Charts (DAC) in 1999, while the album track "Return" ranked #2 on the DAC singles charts the same year.

Track listing
 "Intro" – 0:45
 "Return" – 4:24
 "Kiss The Future" – 4:06
 "My Shadows" – 4:39
 "Into My Arms" – 5:21
 "Overpaid" – 3:34
 "Venus Man" – 4:06
 "The Game" – 4:24
 "Kasmodiah" – 3:52
 "Lass mich" – 4:46
 "Sometimes" – 4:35
 "Fight" – 5:36
 "Try" – 6:23

References

1999 albums
Deine Lakaien albums
Dark wave albums